In Italy there are many magazines. Following the end of World War II the number of weekly magazines significantly expanded.  From 1970 feminist magazines began to increase in number in the country. The number of consumer magazines was 975 in 1995 and 782 in 2004. There are also Catholic magazines and newspapers in the country. A total of fifty-eight Catholic magazines was launched between 1867 and 1922. From 1923 to 1943, the period of the Fascist Regime, only ten new Catholic magazines was started. The period from 1943 to the end of the Second Vatican Council thirty-three new magazines were established. Until 2010 an additional eighty-six Catholic magazines were founded. 

The magazines had 3,400 million euros revenues in 2009, and 21.5% of these revenues were from advertising.

The following is an incomplete list of current and defunct magazines published in Italy. They are published in Italian or other languages.

0-9
 30 Days
 900, Cahiers d'Italie et d'Europe

A

 ABC
 Abitare
 Affari Esteri
 Agora
 AIPC Magazine
 Airone
 L'ala d'Italia
 alfabeta
 Alter
 Altreragioni
 Amica
 Anna
 Annabella
 Archeo
 Archeologia Viva
 ARCHI magazine
 L’Architettura
 L'Asino
 Asso di bastoni
 L'Audace
 Aut Aut
 L'Avventuroso
 L'Azione Coloniale

B

 Il Balilla
 Il Baretti
 Il Bargello
 Il Becco Giallo
 Belfagor
 Bertoldo
 Bianco e Nero
 Byoblu Informazioni Classificate
 Blow Up
 Blue
 Bolero Film
 Il Borghese
 Botteghe Oscure
 Brera
 Broom: An International Magazine of the Arts
 Buscadero
 Butchered from Inside

C

 Il Caffè
 Il Caffè
Calcio 2000
Il Calcio Illustrato
Il calendario del popolo
Campo di Marte
Candido
Cannibale
Cantachiaro
 Cordelia
Casabella
Chi
Ciak
Cinema Nuovo
Cipria
Circoli
Class
Classe Operaia
Collezioni
Colors
Comunità
 Il Conciliatore
 Confidentiel
 Corrente di Vita
Corriere dei Piccoli
Corriere delle dame
Corriere Emiliano
Cose di Casa
Il Costruttore
Il Covile
La Critica
Critica fascista
Critica marxista
La Cucina Italiana
Cucinare Bene
Cuore

D

 Diario
 La Difesa della Razza
Disney Big
 Divisare
 Dlui
 Domus
 Don Basilio
 La Donna
 Donna Moderna

E

 Easy Milano
 Effe
 Emporium
 Epoca
 Espansione
 Espero
 L'espresso
 Eurasia, Rivista di Studi Geopolitici
 Eureka
 L'Europeo
 Eva

F

 Famiglia Cristiana
 Fenomeno Inter
 La Fiera Letteraria
 Figli d'Italia
 Flash Art
 Focus
 For Men
 Forza Milan
 Frigidaire
 Il Frontespizio

G

 Gambero Rosso
 Game Pro
 The Games Machine
 Gente
 Gerarchia
 Giochi per il mio computer
 Gioia
 Giornale dei Ragazzi
 Il Giornalino
 Il giornalino della Domenica
 Il Giorno dei Ragazzi
 Gioventù Fascista
 Grand Hotel
 Grazia
 Guerin Meschino
 Guerin Sportivo

H
 Hebdomada Aenigmatum
 Hurrà Juventus

I

 Industrial Engineering News Italia
 Internazionale
 Interni
 Intrepido
 IO Donna

J
 Jack
 Journal de Bordighera
 Jumbo

K
 Klat

L

 L'Approdo
 L'Italia settimanale
 L’Italiano
 L’Italia futurista
 Lanciostory
 Lapis
 Lavoro Politico
 Le Arti
 Leggere Donna
 Lei
 Leonardo
  Lettres de Rome
 Letteratura
 Liberal
 Lidel
 Limes
 Linus
  Lo Sport Fascista
 Lombard
 La Lupa

M

 Madrigale
 Il Mago
 Malafemmina
 Marc'Aurelio
 Margherita
 Il Male
  Il Marzocco
 Max
 Memoria
 Il Menabò di letteratura
 Mente
 Meridiano di Roma
 Messenger of Saint Anthony
 Micron
 MicroMega
 Millionaire
 Il Mio Papa
 Il Mondo
 Mondoperaio
 Il Monello
 Il Mulino 
 Musica Jazz

N

 Neural magazine
 Nintendo La Rivista Ufficiale
 Noi: Rivista d’arte futurista
 Noi donne
 Noi Ragazzi
 Noi Testarde
 Novella 2000
 Nuovi Argomenti
 Nuovo Canzoniere Italiano
 La Nuova Italia

O

 Occidente
 Officina
 Oggi
 Omnibus
 Onomata Kechiasmena
  Le Ore
 Orient Express
 Orpheus

P

 Paesaggio Urbano
 Panorama
 Paperino e altre avventure
 Pattuglia
 Pègaso
 Perini Journal
 Piemonte Parchi
  Il Pioniere
 Platform Architecture and Design
 Playmen
 PlayStation
 La Plebe
 Poesia
 Il Politecnico
 Popoli
 Presenza
 Progetto Babele
 Protecta

Q

 Quaderni Rossi
 Quadrante
 Quarto Stato
 Quattroruote
 Qui Touring

R

 Radiocorriere
 Il Regno
 Rinascita
 Rivista Italiana Difesa
La Rivoluzione Liberale
 Rockerilla
 La Ronda
 Rosso e Nero

S

 Il Saggiatore 
 Der Schlern
 Le Scienze
 Lo Scolaro
 Il Selvaggio
 Sette
 Settimana Incom 
 La Settimana Enigmistica
 La Sibilla
 Sigma
 Silhouette Donna
 Skorpio
 Società 
 Soft Revolution
 Sogno
 Solaria
 Sottosopra
 Lo Stato
 Strapaese
 Sud
 Sukia
 Superbasket Magazine

T

 Tempo
 Tempo Presente
 This is a magazine
 Topolino
 Il Travaso delle idee
 Tribana Illustrata
 Tu Style
 Tuttestorie
 TV Sorrisi e Canzoni

U
 L'Universale
 Urania
 Urbanistica

V

 Valori plastici
 Velvet 
 Il Venerdì
 La Verità
 Il Vernacoliere
 Il Verri
 Vie Nuove
 Vita e pensiero
 Il Vittorioso
 La Voce
 Vogue Italia
 Al Volante
 Volare

X
 Xbox Magazine Ufficiale

Y
Yamato

See also
 List of newspapers in Italy
 Media of Italy

References

Italy
Magazines

Magazines